This is a list of tennis players who have represented the Netherlands Fed Cup team in an official Fed Cup match. The Netherlands have taken part in the competition since 1963.

Players

References

External links
Royal Dutch Lawn Tennis Association

Fed Cup
Lists of Billie Jean King Cup tennis players